Isla Coloradito is an island in the Gulf of California east of the Baja California Peninsula. The island is uninhabited and is part of San Felipe Municipality.

Biology

Isla Coloradito has only one endemic species of reptile, Uta tumidarostra (Swollen-Nosed Side-blotched Lizard).

References

Islands of Baja California
Uninhabited islands of Mexico